Luis Mario Cabrera Molina (born 9 July 1956) is an Argentine retired footballer who played as a striker.

He spent almost his entire career in Spain – 12 seasons in representation of three teams, mainly Atlético Madrid.

Club career
Cabrera was born in La Rioja. He started his career in his country with Club Atlético Huracán in 1975, scoring 19 goals in two years. In 1978, he moved to Spain, starting out at CD Castellón in its second division.

For the 1980–81 season, Cabrera joined Atlético Madrid, but struggled for most of his stay there, overshadowed by Mexican Hugo Sánchez. Eventually the pair complemented itself, combining for 33 La Liga goals in 1984–85 as the capital side finished second and won the Copa del Rey; after the latter's departure to Real Madrid he played even more, and started in the following year's UEFA Cup Winners' Cup final, lost to FC Dynamo Kyiv.

Towards the end of his career, Cabrera played for Cádiz CF and had a second spell with Castellón (helping them promote to the top flight in his debut campaign), retiring at 34 with 209 matches and 63 goals in Spain's main tier.

Honours

References

External links

Atlético's Encyclopedia bio 

1956 births
Living people
Sportspeople from La Rioja Province, Argentina
Argentine footballers
Association football forwards
Argentine Primera División players
Club Atlético Huracán footballers
La Liga players
Segunda División players
CD Castellón footballers
Atlético Madrid footballers
Cádiz CF players
Argentine expatriate footballers
Expatriate footballers in Spain
Argentine expatriate sportspeople in Spain